Estadio do Portimonense is a multi-use stadium in Portimão, Portugal.  It is currently used mostly for football matches and is the home stadium of Portimonense SC. The stadium is able to hold 16,500 people and was built in 1970.

Portimonense
Buildings and structures in Portimão
Sport in Portimão
Sports venues completed in 1970